James Arthur O'Connor (1792 – 7 January 1841) was an Irish painter.

Career
James Arthur O'Connor was born 15 Aston's Quay, Dublin – the son of an engraver and printer, William O'Connor. O'Connor would become a distinguished landscape painter. He was self-taught, receiving just a few lessons from William Sadler. He travelled to London with Francis Danby and George Petrie, exhibiting at the Royal Academy in 1822. O'Connor visited France, Belgium, the Netherlands, and the Rhineland. He died poor, in Brompton, London, 7 January 1841. O'Connor was married – his wife's name was Anastatia.

Gallery

List of paintings
The list below contains an incomplete list of his works and gives either the owner (in 1985) or the location of where the original is found today (or both).

References

Bibliography
Hutchinson, John. James Arthur O'Connor. Dublin: The National Gallery of Ireland, 1985. .

Further reading

External links
O'Connor painting at AskArt
O'Connor at Wolverhampton Arts

1792 births
1841 deaths
19th-century Irish painters
Irish male painters
Irish landscape painters
Painters from Dublin (city)
19th-century Irish male artists